The Minister of Agriculture, Forestry and Fisheries was a Minister of the Cabinet of South Africa from 2009 to 2019, with political executive responsibility for the Department of Agriculture, Forestry and Fisheries, and for the Agricultural Research Council, the National Agricultural Marketing Council, Onderstepoort Biological Products, the Perishable Products Export Control Board, and Ncera Farms.

The Agriculture, Forestry and Fisheries portfolio was created in the 2009 cabinet reorganization after the election of President Jacob Zuma; the Minister inherited the responsibility for agriculture from the Minister of Agriculture and Land Affairs, the responsibility for fisheries from the Minister of Environmental Affairs and Tourism, and the responsibility for forestry from the Minister of Water Affairs and Forestry. The first Minister of Agriculture, Forestry and Fisheries was Tina Joemat-Peterson and her deputy was Pieter Mulder. The last Minister of Agriculture, Forestry and Fisheries was Senzeni Zokwana with Sfiso Buthelezi as his deputy. In May 2019 the cabinet was reorganised and the portfolio's responsibilities were divided between the Minister of Agriculture, Land Reform and Rural Development and the Minister of Environment, Forestry and Fisheries.

References

External links
Department of Agriculture, Forestry and Fisheries

Agriculture, Forestry and Fisheries
South Africa
South Africa
Lists of political office-holders in South Africa